Vittorio Paggio (born 19 September 1973), known by the stage name Omar Galanti, is an Italian pornographic actor.

Biography
Galanti began his career as a porn actor in 2004 and to date has starred in about 500 porn productions. In 2010 he signed as exclusive contract as director with Evil Angel's Buttman Magazine Choice niche.

Omar Galanti started his career in low budget pornographic productions in Milan in 2004.

All productions were impressed by his attitude and his professionalism. He started to be very requested from different directors and finally he was also noticed by Rocco Siffredi.

He started to cooperate constantly with Rocco Siffredi in 2006, appearing in most movies of the most famous Italian actor and director for the next 4 years.

Despite this, his career was full of ups and downs until he signed an exclusive contract as director with Evil Angel's Buttman Magazine Choice niche in 2010. He released several movies until 2013 when, after a controversial disagreement with all the adult industry in Hungary and USA, he decided to retire from the adult industry.

He is actually living in Italy and running a bike shop, cultivating his passion for mountain bike and cycling.

Galanti has appeared on TV programs such as Le Iene and Lucignolo. In 2008 he was a contestant in the FX reality show Ciak si giri.

Partial filmography

Mucchio selvaggio - 2007, regia di Matteo Swaitz
Belle streghe in calore - 2011, regia di Marco Nero

Awards and nominations
 2006 Ninfa Prize nominee - Best Supporting Actor - Those fucking nuts
 2007 AVN Award nominee - Male Foreign Performer of the Year
 2008 AVN Award winner – Best Sex Scene in a Foreign-Shot Production - Furious Fuckers Final Race
 2008 AVN Award nominee - Male Foreign Performer of the Year
 2009 AVN Award nominee - Male Foreign Performer Of The Year
 2009 Hot d'Or nominee - Best European Actor - Dans Règlements De Comptes
 2010 AVN Award nominee - Male Foreign Performer of the Year
 2011 AVN Award nominee - Male Foreign Performer of the Year
 2011 AVN Award nominee - Best Director – Foreign Non-Feature - Omar's Russian Impact!
 2012 AVN Award nominee - Male Foreign Performer of the Year
2013 XBIZ Award nominee - Male Foreign Performer of the Year

References

1973 births
Italian male film actors
Italian male pornographic film actors
Italian pornographic film directors
Living people
People from Gattinara
Playgirl Men of the Month